Lemförde is a railway station located in Lemförde, Germany. The station is located on the Wanne-Eickel–Hamburg railway. The train services are operated by Deutsche Bahn.

Train services
The following services currently call at the station:

Regional services  Bremerhaven-Lehe - Bremen - Osnabrück

References

Railway stations in Lower Saxony